William Johnson Bacon (February 18, 1803 – July 3, 1889) was an American politician and a U.S. Representative from New York.

Early life
Bacon was born on February 18, 1803, in Williamstown, Massachusetts to Abigail (née Smith) and Ezekiel Bacon. He was the grandson of John Bacon. He moved with his family to Utica, New York, in 1815. He graduated from Hamilton College in 1822. Then he studied law at Litchfield Law School and graduated in 1824. Bacon studied for a year in the law office of Joseph and Charles P. Kirkland. He was admitted to the bar in 1824, and commenced practice in Utica.

Career
Bacon was appointed city attorney of Utica in 1837, and was a member of the New York State Assembly in 1850. He was elected a trustee of Hamilton College in 1851. He was a justice of the New York Supreme Court (5th District) from 1854 to 1870, and was ex officio a judge of the New York Court of Appeals in 1860 and 1868.

Elected as a Republican to the 45th United States Congress, Bacon served as U.S. Representative for the twenty-third district of New York from March 4, 1877 to March 3, 1879.  Afterwards he resumed the practice of law.

Personal life
Bacon married Eliza Kirkland on October 23, 1828 and subsequent to her death in 1872, he was married to Susan Sloan Gillette in 1874.

Bacon died in Utica, Oneida County, New York, on July 3, 1889. He is interred at Forest Hill Cemetery in Utica.

References

External links

The New York Civil List compiled by Franklin Benjamin Hough (pages 239, 256 and 351; Weed, Parsons and Co., 1858)
 Court of Appeals judges

1803 births
1889 deaths
Republican Party members of the New York State Assembly
Hamilton College (New York) alumni
People from Williamstown, Massachusetts
Politicians from Utica, New York
New York Supreme Court Justices
Judges of the New York Court of Appeals
Republican Party members of the United States House of Representatives from New York (state)
19th-century American politicians
19th-century American judges
Litchfield Law School alumni
Burials at Forest Hill Cemetery (Utica, New York)